Malakichthys barbatus is a species of fish found in the oceans of the Indo-west Pacific: Japan, South China Sea and Australia at depths ranging from 100 – 600 meters.

References

barbatus
Fish described in 2001